The list of ship commissionings in 1934 includes a chronological list of all ships commissioned in 1934.


See also

References 

1934
 Ship commissionings